Shedd Park may refer to:

Shedd Park (Chicago), location of Shedd Park Fieldhouse
Shedd Park (Lowell, Massachusetts)

See also
Shedd Aquarium, Chicago, not located in Shedd Park